Narcisa is a genus of beetles in the tribe Gymnochilini. The species are found in Far East Asia.

References

External links 
 
 Narcisa at insectoid.info

Trogossitidae
Cleroidea genera